John Harriott may refer to:
 John Harriott (sailor), English sailor involved in founding the Marine Police Force
 John Edward Harriott, fur trader for the Hudson's Bay Company
 John Staples Harriott, British army officer in the service of the East India Company